The Open Access Journal of Medicinal and Aromatic Plants is a biannual peer-reviewed open-access medical journal published by the Medicinal and Aromatic Plants Association of India. The journal was established in 2010 and covers all aspects of medicinal and aromatic plants. The present editor-in-chief is Manivel Ponnuchamy, Director (Acting), Directorate of Medicinal and Aromatic Plants Research, Anand

Scope of the Journal 
It aims to publish scientific articles related to medicinal and aromatic plants (MAPs) on the aspects like botany, taxonomy, ecology, crop husbandry, crop protection, genetic improvement including molecular genetics, plant physiology, plant biochemistry (including plant organic chemistry), plant microbiology, and related areas but not pharmacology or pharmacognosy.

Journal policies
Preprints Policy: The journal has a policy for archiving or sharing preprints. As per its policy, the authors are permitted to post their work online prior to and during the submission process.

Open Access Policy: Journal had adopted a policy to provided immediate open access to all its content published.

Copyright Policy: The authors of the articles published in the journal retain copyright and grant the journal right of first publication licensed under a Creative Commons Attribution CC BY 4.0

Abstracting and indexing
The journal is abstracted and indexed in:
Chemical Abstracts Service
CAB International
Scopus
Directory of Open Access scholarly Resources (ROAD)
SCImago Journal Rank

References

External links
 

Creative Commons Attribution-licensed journals
Publications established in 2010
English-language journals
Pharmacology journals
Biannual journals
Academic journals published by learned and professional societies of India